This is a list of earthquakes in 1979. Only earthquakes of magnitude 6 or above are included, unless they result in damage and/or casualties, or are notable for some other reason. Events in remote areas will not be listed but included in statistics and maps. Countries are entered on the lists in order of their status in this particular year. All dates are listed according to UTC time. Maximum intensities are indicated on the Mercalli intensity scale and are sourced from United States Geological Survey (USGS) ShakeMap data. A fairly quiet year once again although there was a number of events which caused significant fatalities. The largest of only 8 magnitude 7.0+ events reached 7.9 and struck Indonesia in September. Ecuador was affected by a magnitude 7.7 in December which left 600 people dead. Other areas suffering from deadly events included Iran, Colombia, Indonesia and present day Montenegro.

By death toll

Listed are earthquakes with at least 10 dead.

By magnitude

Listed are earthquakes with at least 7.0 magnitude.

By month

January

February

March

April

May

June

July

August

September

October

November

December

References

External links 

1979
1979 earthquakes
1979